35th Anniversary is an album by Walter Ostanek and His Band, released in 1992. In 1993, the album won Ostanek the Grammy Award for Best Polka Album.

Track listing

References

External links
Walter Ostanek Band's official site

1992 albums
Polka albums
Grammy Award for Best Polka Album